Pantepuisaurus is a genus of lizard in the family Gymnophthalmidae. The genus is monotypic, containing only one species, Pantepuisaurus rodriguesi. The species is endemic to Guyana.

Etymology
The specific name, rodriguesi, is in honor of Brazilian herpetologist Miguel Trefaut Rodrigues.

Geographic range
P. rodriguesi occurs in western Guyana.

Habitat

References

Further reading
Cole CJ, Townsend CR, Reynolds RP, MacCulloch RD, Lathrop A (2013). "Amphibians and reptiles of Guyana, South America: illustrated keys, annotated species accounts, and a biogeographic synopsis". Proceedings of the Biological Society of Washington 125 (4): 317-578 + Plates 580–620. 
Kok PJR (2009). "Lizard in the clouds: a new highland genus and species of Gymnophthalmidae (Reptilia: Squamata) from Maringma tepui, western Guyana". Zootaxa 1992: 53–67. (Pantepuisaurus rodriguesi, new genus and species).

Gymnophthalmidae
Lizard genera
Taxa named by Philippe J.R. Kok
Fauna of the Tepuis